André Chassaigne (born 2 July 1950) is a French politician who has presided over the Democratic and Republican Left group in the National Assembly since 2012. A member of the French Communist Party (PCF), he has been the member of the National Assembly for the 5th constituency of the Puy-de-Dôme department since 2002.

Biography
A native of Clermont-Ferrand, Chassaigne worked as a middle school principal in Saint-Amant-Roche-Savine from 1981 to 2002. He became deputy mayor in 1977 before assuming the mayorship from 1983, an office he resigned in 2010. He was succeeded by his son François Chassaigne. He also served as the general councillor of Puy-de-Dôme for the canton of Saint-Amant-Roche-Savine from 1979 to 2004 and a regional councillor of Auvergne from 1998 to 2000 and again from 2010 until 2015.

Chassaigne was elected to the National Assembly in 2002. He was the sole Communist to win a constituency previously held by another party that cycle. In 2012, he assumed the presidency of the Democratic and Republican Left group. Chassaigne was ranked as the best member of the National Assembly by the magazine Capital in 2017, for his attendance and implication in parliamentary work. On 12 March 2020, during the COVID-19 pandemic, he announced he had tested positive for COVID-19.

References

1950 births
Living people
Politicians from Clermont-Ferrand
French Communist Party politicians
Chevaliers of the Légion d'honneur
Knights of the Ordre national du Mérite
Deputies of the 12th National Assembly of the French Fifth Republic
Deputies of the 13th National Assembly of the French Fifth Republic
Deputies of the 14th National Assembly of the French Fifth Republic
Deputies of the 15th National Assembly of the French Fifth Republic
Mayors of places in Auvergne-Rhône-Alpes
Deputies of the 16th National Assembly of the French Fifth Republic